Marcos Juárez Department is a  department of Córdoba Province in Argentina.

The provincial subdivision has a population of about 99,761 inhabitants in an area of 9,490 km², and its capital city is Marcos Juárez, which is located around 450 km from Capital Federal.

Settlements
 Alejo Ledesma
 Arias
 Camilo Aldao
 Capitán General Bernardo O'Higgins
 Cavanagh
 Colonia Barge
 Colonia Italiana
 Corral de Bustos
 Cruz Alta
 General Baldissera
 General Roca
 Guatimozín
 Inriville
 Isla Verde
 Leones
 Los Surgentes
 Marcos Juárez
 Monte Buey
 Saira
 Saladillo
 Villa Elisa

Departments of Córdoba Province, Argentina